The Expression of the Emotions in Man and Animals is Charles Darwin's third major work of evolutionary theory, following On the Origin of Species (1859) and The Descent of Man (1871).  Initially intended as a chapter in The Descent of Man, The Expression grew in length and was published separately in 1872. This book concerns the biological aspects of emotional life, and Darwin explores the animal origins of such human characteristics as the lifting of the eyebrows in moments of surprise and the raising of the upper lip in an aggressive sneer. A German translation of The Expression appeared in 1872; Dutch and French versions followed in 1873 and 1874. A second edition of the book, with only minor alterations, was published in 1890. Since its first publication, The Expression has never been out of print, but it has also been described as Darwin's "forgotten masterpiece".

Before Darwin, human emotional life had posed problems to the western philosophical categories of mind and body. Darwin's interest can be traced to his time as an Edinburgh medical student and the 1824 edition of Sir Charles Bell's Anatomy and Philosophy of Expression which argued for a spiritual dimension to the subject. In contrast, Darwin's biological approach links emotions to their origins in animal behaviour, and allows cultural factors only an auxiliary role in the shaping of expression. This biological emphasis leads to a concentration on six emotional states: happiness, sadness, fear, anger, surprise and disgust. It also leads to an appreciation of the universal nature of expression, with its implication of a single origin for the entire human species; and Darwin points to the importance of emotional communication with children in their psychological development. Darwin sought out the opinions of some leading British psychiatrists, notably James Crichton-Browne, in the preparation of the book which forms his main contribution to psychology.

Amongst the innovations with this book are Darwin's circulation of a questionnaire (probably inspired by his cousin, Francis Galton) during his preparatory research; simple psychology experiments  on the recognition of emotions with his friends and family; and (borrowing from Duchenne de Boulogne, a physician at the Salpêtrière) the use of photography in his presentation of scientific information. Publisher John Murray warned Darwin that including the photographs would "poke a hole in the profits" of the book; and The Expression of the Emotions is an important landmark in the history of book illustration.

The book's development: biographical aspects

Background: In the weeks before Queen Victoria's coronation in 1838, Charles Darwin sought medical advice on his mysterious physical symptoms, and then travelled to Scotland for a period of rest and a "geologizing expedition" – but actually spent some of his time re-exploring the old haunts of his undergraduate days. On the day of the coronation, 28 June 1838, Darwin was in Edinburgh.  Two weeks later (15 July 1838), he opened a private notebook with philosophical and psychological speculation – the M (metaphysics) Notebook – and, over the next three months, filled it with his thoughts about possible interactions of hereditary factors with the mental and behavioural aspects of life. It should also be noted that Darwin made his first attempt at autobiography in August 1838.

The critical importance of the M Notebook has often been viewed in relation to Darwin's conception of natural selection as the central mechanism of evolutionary development, which he fully grasped towards the end of September 1838, after encountering the sixth edition of Thomas Malthus' Essay on Population (1826). The M notebook (strangely silent about natural selection) has a tentative and fragmented quality, especially in Darwin's descriptions of conversation with his father (a successful doctor with a special interest in psychiatric problems) about recurring patterns of behavior in successive generations of his patients' families. Darwin was anxious about the materialistic drift in his thinking – and of the disrepute which this could attract in early Victorian England – at the time, he was mentally preparing for marriage with his cousin Emma Wedgwood who held firm Christian beliefs. On 21 September 1838, Darwin recorded a confused and disturbing dream in which he was involved in a public execution where the corpse came to life and joked about not running away and facing death like a hero. In summary: Darwin assembled the central features of his evolutionary theory as he was developing an appreciation of human behavior and family life – and he was in some emotional turmoil. A discussion of the significance of Darwin's notebooks can be found in Paul H. Barrett's Metaphysics, Materialism and the Evolution of Mind – Early Writings of Charles Darwin (1980).

Development of the Text 1866–1872: Very little of Darwin's turmoil surfaced in On the Origin of Species in 1859, although Chapter 7 contains a mildly expressed argument on instinctive behaviour. In the public management of his evolutionary theory, Darwin understood that its relevance to human emotional life could draw a hostile response. Nevertheless, while preparing the text of The Variation of Animals and Plants Under Domestication in 1866, Darwin took the decision to publish a book on human ancestry, sexual selection and emotional life. After his initial correspondence with the psychiatrist James Crichton-Browne, Darwin set aside his material concerning emotional expression in order to complete The Descent of Man, which covered human ancestry and sexual selection. He finished work on The Descent of Man on 15 January 1871. Two days later, he started on The Expression of the Emotions and, working quickly, completed most of the text within four months; progress then slowed because of a recurrence of his  symptoms, triggered by an attack from St George Jackson Mivart. However, on 22 August 1872, he finished work on the proofs. In this book, Darwin brings his evolutionary theory into close approximation with behavioural science, although many Darwin scholars have remarked on a kind of spectral Lamarckism haunting the text of the Emotions.

Universal Nature of Expression: Darwin notes the universal nature of expressions in the book, writing:  "the young and the old of widely different races, both with man and animals, express the same state of mind by the same movements."

This connection of mental states to the neurological organization of movement (as the words motive and emotion suggest) is central to Darwin's understanding of emotion. Darwin himself displayed many biographical links between his psychological life and locomotion, taking long, solitary walks around Shrewsbury after his mother's death in 1817, in his seashore rambles near Edinburgh with the Lamarckian evolutionist Robert Edmond Grant in 1826/1827, and in the laying out of the sandwalk, his "thinking path", at Down House in Kent in 1846. These aspects of Darwin's personal life are discussed in John Bowlby's (1990) psychoanalytic biography of Darwin.
 
Darwin emphasises a shared human and animal ancestry in sharp contrast to the arguments deployed in Charles Bell's Anatomy and Philosophy of Expression (1824). Bell claimed that the facial muscles were divinely designed to express uniquely human feelings. Eager to stress the distinction between human and animal communication, Bell wrote: "Expression is to the passions as language is to thought." In The Expression, Darwin reformulates the issues at play, writing: "The force of language is much aided by the expressive movements of the face and body" - hinting at a neurological intimacy of language with psychomotor function (body language), and underscoring the social value of expression.

Darwin's Sources on Emotional Expression:  Darwin had attended a debate about emotional expression at the Plinian Society in December 1826 when he was a medical student at Edinburgh University. This had been prompted by the publication of Sir Charles Bell's Anatomy and Philosophy of Expression; and in his presentation, the phrenologist William A.F. Browne (in a spirited account of Robert Grant's Lamarckist evolutionism) ridiculed Bell's theological explanations, pointing instead to the striking similarities of human and animal biology. The meeting then ended in uproar. Forty-five years later, Darwin revisits these arguments and recruits Duchenne's (1862) unmasking of the facial mechanisms, shifting the argument from philosophical speculation to scientific discourse and highlighting the importance of facial expression. Darwin's response to Bell's natural theology is discussed by Lucy Hartley (2001).

Darwin corresponded intensively with James Crichton-Browne, the son of the phrenologist William A. F. Browne and now the medical director of the Wakefield asylum. At the time, Crichton-Browne was publishing his extremely influential West Riding Lunatic Asylum Medical Reports, and Darwin remarked to him that The Expression "should be called by Darwin and Browne". Darwin also drew on his personal experience of the symptoms of bereavement and studied the text of Henry Maudsley's 1870 Gulstonian lectures on Body and Mind.

Darwin considered other approaches to the study of emotions, including their depiction in the arts – discussed by the actor Henry Siddons in his Practical Illustrations of Rhetorical Gesture and Action (1807) and by the anatomist Robert Knox in his Manual of Artistic Anatomy (1852) – but abandoned them as unreliable, although Shakespearean quotations are scattered through the text. It is notable also that Darwin does not include a discussion of deception in his psychology of emotional expression.

Structure

Darwin opens the book with three chapters on "the general principles of expression", introducing the rather Lamarckist phrase serviceable associated habits. With this phrase, Darwin seeks to describe the initially voluntary actions which come together to constitute the complex expressions of emotion. He then invokes a principle of antithesis, through which opposite states of mind induce directly opposing movements. Finally, he discusses a direct action of the nervous system, in which an overflow of emotion is widely discharged, producing more generalised emotional expression.

This is followed by a section (three more chapters) on modes of emotional expression peculiar to particular species, including man. He then moves on to the main argument with his characteristic approach of astonishingly widespread and detailed observations. Chapter 7 discusses "low spirits", including anxiety, grief, dejection and despair; and the contrasting Chapter 8 "high spirits" with joy, love, tender feelings and devotion. In his discussion of "low spirits", Darwin writes: "After the mind has suffered an acute paroxysm of grief, and the cause still continues, we fall into a state of low spirits, or we may be utterly cast down and dejected. Prolonged bodily pain, if not amounting to an agony, generally leads to the same state of mind. If we expect to suffer, we are anxious; if we have no hope of relief, we despair."

Subsequent chapters include considerations of "reflection and meditation" (associated with "ill-temper", sulkiness and determination), Chapter 10 on hatred and anger, Chapter 11 on "disdain, contempt, disgust, guilt, pride, helplessness, patience and affirmation" and Chapter 12 on "surprise, astonishment, fear and horror". In his discussion of the emotion of disgust, Darwin notes its close links to the sense of smell, and conjectures an association with excretory products. In Chapter 13, Darwin discusses complex emotional states including self-attention, shame, shyness, modesty and blushing. Darwin describes blushing as "the most peculiar and most human of the expressions".

Darwin closes the book with Chapter 14 in which he recapitulates his main argument: he shows how human emotions link mental states with bodily movement, and are genetically determined, deriving from purposeful animal actions. He comments on the implications of the book: a single origin for the entire human species, with universal human expressions; and he stresses the social value of expression, citing the emotional communication between mother and child.

Illustrations
This was one of the first books to be illustrated with photographs – with seven heliotype plates – and the publisher John Murray warned that this "would poke a [terrible] hole in the profits".

The published book assembled illustrations rather like a Victorian family album, with engravings of the Darwin family's domestic pets by the zoological illustrator T. W. Wood as well as work by the artists Briton Rivière, Joseph Wolf and A.D. May. It also included portraits by the Swedish photographer Oscar Rejlander (1813–1875), anatomical diagrams by Sir Charles Bell (1774–1842) and Friedrich Henle (1809–1885), as well as illustrational quotations from the Mécanisme de la physionomie humaine (1862) by the French neurologist Duchenne de Boulogne (1806–1875). As a result of his domestic psychology experiments, Darwin reduced the number of commonly observed emotions from Duchenne's calculation of more than sixty facial expressions, to just six "core" expressions: anger, fear, surprise, disgust, happiness and sadness.

Darwin received dozens of photographs of psychiatric patients from James Crichton-Browne, but included in the book only one engraving (photoengraved by James Davis Cooper) based on these illustrations – sent on 6 June 1870 (along with Darwin's copy of Duchenne's Mécanisme) (Darwin Correspondence Project: Letter 7220). This was Figure 19, p. 296  – and showed a patient (Crichton-Browne reported) under the care of Dr James Gilchrist at the Southern Counties Asylum (of Scotland), the public wing of the Crichton Royal in Dumfries.

Reception

Contemporary

The review in the January 1873 Quarterly Journal of Science concluded that "although some parts are a little tedious, from the amount of minute detail required, there is throughout so much of acute observation and amusing anecdote as to render it perhaps more attractive to general readers than any of Mr. Darwin's previous work".

Modern

Eric Korn, in the London Review of Books, describes how the book was claimed, and he argues subverted, by Margaret Mead and her "sympathisers", and then presented afresh by Paul Ekman. Ekman had collected pro-Darwin, anti-Mead evidence, Korn wrote, for the universality of human facial expression of emotions. Darwin, suggests Korn, avoided unsettling the Victorian public by arguing that humans had "animal traits", and instead charmed them by telling stories of "human traits in animals", thus avoiding too much explicit talk of natural selection at work. Darwin preferred to leave the evolutionary implications hanging. Korn points out that the book has never been out of print since 1872, calling into question Ekman's talk of "Darwin's lost masterpiece".

The "Editor's notes" at the "Mead Project source page" on the book comment that

Publication

Darwin concluded work on the book with a sense of relief. The proofs, tackled by his daughter Henrietta ("Ettie") and son Leo, required a major revision which made Darwin "sick of the subject and myself, and the world".

The Expression was published by John Murray on 26 November 1872. It quickly sold around 7,000 copies and was widely praised as a charming and accessible introduction to Darwin's evolutionary theories.

A second edition was published by Darwin's son in 1890, without several revisions suggested by Darwin; these were not published until the third edition of 1999 (edited by Paul Ekman).

Influence

Published as a sequel to The Descent of Man, The Expression was assured of a wide readership in mid-Victorian England. However, the early death of George Romanes (1848–1894) robbed Darwin of a powerful advocate in the field of comparative psychology and his impact on academic psychology was muted, partly because of Wilhelm Wundt's dimensional approach to the emotions and the widespread influence of the behaviorist school during the twentieth century.

The generous style of biological illustration  was followed in work on animal locomotion by photographer Eadweard Muybridge (1830–1904) (leading to cinematography), and by the Scottish naturalist James Bell Pettigrew (1832–1908); in the extensively (and controversially) illustrated works of the evolutionary biologist Ernst Haeckel; and – to a lesser extent – in D'Arcy Thompson's On Growth and Form (1917).

Darwin's ideas were followed up in William James' What Is An Emotion ? (1884); and, in the James-Lange theory of emotions, James develops Darwin's emphasis on the physical aspects, including the visceral (autonomically mediated) components of emotion. In Walter Cannon's Bodily Changes in Pain, Hunger, Fear and Rage (1915), Cannon introduces the famous phrase fight or flight response, formulating emotions in terms of strategies for interpersonal behaviour and amplified in groups or crowds (herd behavior). More recent psychological theories of emotion have been set out in the Papez-Maclean hypothesis, the Two factor theory of emotion (Schachter and Singer) and the Theory of constructed emotion.

On 24 January 1895, James Crichton-Browne delivered a notable lecture in Dumfries, Scotland On Emotional Expression, presenting some of his reservations about Darwin's views. Crichton-Browne argued for a greater role for the higher cortical centres in the regulation of the emotional response, and touches on the theme of gender differences in emotional expression, anticipating the approach of sociologist Norbert Elias in The Civilizing Process. In 1905, Sir Arthur Mitchell, a psychiatrist who had served as William A.F. Browne's deputy in the Scottish Lunacy Commission, published About Dreaming, Laughing and Blushing, linking some of Darwin's concerns with those of psychoanalysis.

Freud's early publications on the symptoms of hysteria (with his influential concept of unconscious emotional conflict) acknowledged debts to Darwin's work on emotional expression and Darwin's impact on psychoanalysis is discussed in detail by Lucille Ritvo. John Bowlby makes extensive reference to Darwin's ideas in his presentations of attachment theory. Constitutional (psychosomatic) theories of personality were elaborated by neurologist Paul Schilder (1886–1940) with his notion of the body image, by the psychiatrist Ernst Kretschmer and in the (now largely discredited) somato-typology of W H Sheldon (1898–1977). The biological aspects of the human emotions were further explored by Desmond Morris in his (richly illustrated) popular scientific book Manwatching, and recent research has confirmed that while cultural factors are critical in the determination of gesture, genetic factors are crucial to the formation of facial expression.  In 2003, the New York Academy of Sciences published Emotions Inside Out: 130 Years after Darwin's The Expression of the Emotions in Man and Animals, a collection of 37 papers (edited by Paul Ekman) with recent research on the subject.

See also

Affect display
Body language
Book illustration
Charles Darwin's health
Emotion and memory
Emotional intelligence
Emotions in animals
Evolution of emotion
Facial expression
Nonverbal communication
Posture (psychology)

References

Sources

External links

.
.
.

Free e-book versions:
 D. Appleton, New York, 1899
 

1872 books
Books by Charles Darwin
Books about emotions
Books about mental health
History of mental health in the United Kingdom
Books about evolution
Neuroscience books
English-language books
John Murray (publishing house) books